Girona–Costa Brava Airport  (Catalan: Aeroport de Girona-Costa Brava, Spanish: Aeropuerto de Gerona-Costa Brava) is an airport located  southwest of the city of Girona, next to the small village of Vilobí d'Onyar, in the north-east of Catalonia, Spain. The airport is well connected to the Costa Brava and the Pyrenees.

History
The airport was built in 1965, but passenger traffic was modest.

The early 2000s saw passenger numbers grow spectacularly after Ryanair chose Girona as one of its European hubs, marketing it as 'Barcelona-Girona'. In 1993, Girona Airport dealt with only 275,000 passengers; in the six years from 2002 to 2008 passenger numbers increased by nearly ten times from just over 500,000 to more than 5.5 million, but after Ryanair began to move their Barcelona operations from Girona to the larger El Prat International Airport, half of these were lost again in the next 4 years until 2012 with only 2.8 million passengers. 2014 saw less than 2.2 million passengers pass through the airport. In 2016 it carried just 1.6 million passengers.

Facilities
The airport consists of one two-storey passenger terminal building. On the ground floor there are 33 check-in desks, with 11 boarding gates on the first floor for both domestic and international flights. Food is available in the departures area of the airport, as well as a few shops.

Airlines and destinations
The following airlines operate regular scheduled and charter flights to and from Girona:

Statistics

Ground transportation
Along with being an alternative option to Barcelona Airport, Girona Airport is convenient for the resorts along the Costa Brava, such as Lloret de Mar, l'Estartit and Blanes. It is about a 40-minute drive from the French border and many people use Girona Airport as a way of getting to the Pyrenees and the ski resorts of Andorra.

By car
The airport is served by three main roads:
 E-15/AP-7 toll road (Perpignan, France – south of Spain)
 C-25 (Lleida – Vic – Girona)
 N-II, no-toll road (Madrid – Barcelona – Perpignan, France)

By bus
There are six bus lines operating in the airport to:
 Barcelona
 Costa Brava/Maresme (stops at Tossa de Mar, Lloret de Mar, Blanes, Malgrat de Mar, Santa Susanna, Pineda de Mar and Calella de la Costa)
  North Costa Brava (stops at Figueres, Roses, Pineda de Mar, Calella de Palafrugell and Tossa de Mar)
 Girona (25 minutes, one every hour)
 Perpignan in France
 Andorra

By train
The closest main line railway station to the airport is in Girona.
There is a project to build a station for the AVE line LGV Perpignan–Figueres, which passes within a few hundred meters of the terminal.

Incidents and accidents

 On 14 September 1999, at 21:47 UTC, a Boeing 757-204 charter flight from Cardiff, Wales, UK, with 236 passengers and 9 crew overshot the runway when landing in a storm and broke apart. Beyond the mound it hit and severed a number of medium-sized trees and the right engine struck the boundary fence. The aircraft then yawed considerably to the right, passed through the fence, landed again in a field, and its main landing gears collapsed. It finally stopped after a  slide across the field. Damage was substantial: the fuselage was broken in two places and the landing gear and both engines detached. Remarkably, there were no immediate fatalities but 44 people, including the aircraft's captain, received hospital treatment for severe to minor injuries. One elderly passenger died a week later.

References

External links

Official website (Aena)

Airports in Catalonia
Airports established in 1965
Transport in Girona